This is a list of statistics for the 2018 Asia Cup.

Team statistics

Highest team totals

Batting statistics

Most runs

Highest score

Bowling records

Most wickets

Best bowling figures

Most maidens

Fielding Statistics

Most dismissals

Partnership records

By wicket

By runs

External links 

 Series home at ESPNcricinfo

References 

Asia Cup
International cricket competitions in 2018–19
September 2018 sports events in Asia